A Rose for the Dead is an EP released by the Norwegian gothic metal band Theatre of Tragedy in 1997. It was the band's last release using the doom metal-influenced sound that Theatre of Tragedy had originally adopted. "A Rose for the Dead" and "Der Spiegel" are leftovers from the Velvet Darkness They Fear  recording sessions, which were completed after the release of that album. "As the Shadows Dance" is the English-sung version of the single "Der Tanz der Schatten", while the remixes involved the electro-industrial musician Bruno Kramm of the German duo Das Ich. Finally, "Decades" is a cover version of a Joy Division song, which Theatre of Tragedy had recorded for a Norwegian tribute album.

Track listing

Personnel

Theatre of Tragedy
Raymond Rohonyi - vocals
Liv Kristine Espenæs - vocals
Tommy Lindal - guitars
Geir Flikkeid - guitars (he had already left the band at time of publication)
Lorentz Aspen - keyboards
Eirik T. Saltrø - bass
Hein Frode Hansen - drums

Production
Pete Coleman - producer, engineer, mixing with Theatre of Tragedy
Gerhard Magin - engineer, mixing, mastering
Øyvind Grødem - mixing
Bruno Kramm - remix on tracks 4 and 5

References

Theatre of Tragedy albums
1997 EPs
Massacre Records EPs